Kim Seung-gyu (born 30 September 1990) is a South Korean football player who plays as a goalkeeper for Saudi Professional League club Al-Shabab and the South Korea national football team.

Club career
Kim was a much-anticipated youth player of Ulsan Hyundai, and joined the senior team after graduating middle school. However, he usually played in reserve team and high school's team for a long time. He became Ulsan's main goalkeeper after showing impressive performances in important opportunities while existing goalkeeper Kim Young-kwang was injured in 2013. He was also selected for the K League Best XI in that season.

International career

2014 World Cup 
Kim made his senior international debut against Peru on 14 August 2013 in a goalless draw, keeping a clean sheet in his debut.

Kim was named in South Korea's squad for the 2014 FIFA World Cup as the second-choice goalkeeper behind Jung Sung-ryong. He did not play the first two games, but after Jung's poor performance against Algeria he was selected to play against Belgium. He made numerous saves, but conceded one as Korea lost 1–0. Despite the loss, Kim was well praised by the fans for his performance, conceding only one goal against one of the top ranked teams in the world on his World Cup debut.

2014 Asian Games 
Kim was named as an over-aged player for the South Korean under-23 team to play in the 2014 Asian Games. Kim helped his team get a gold medal for the first time in 28 years. Kim conceded no goals in the six matches he played and was granted a military exemption.

Kim was selected for South Korea's squad for the 2018 FIFA World Cup in Russia, but the manager Shin Tae-yong chose Jo Hyeon-woo as his main goalkeeper, and so he couldn't appear during the competition.

2022 World Cup 
After the 2018 World Cup, South Korea's next manager Paulo Bento had great faith in Kim. He participated in the 2019 AFC Asian Cup, conceding two goals during five matches until the quarter-finals. In the 2022 FIFA World Cup qualification, he conceded only three goals during 14 appearances, helping South Korea qualify for the 2022 FIFA World Cup.

In 2022, Kim participated in the World Cup as the first-choice goalkeeper for the first time. During the group stage, he was criticised for failing to block any of Ghana's three shots on target, but proved his abilities by conceding only one goal against Uruguay and Portugal. He met Brazilian forwards in the round of 16, and struggled to defend against them in a 4–1 defeat.

Style of play
Known as one of the most versatile goalkeepers in South Korea, Kim is originally noted for his quick reflexes and movement, and also polished up his passing skills in the J1 League.

Career statistics

Club

International

Honours
Ulsan Hyundai
 Korean League Cup: 2011
 AFC Champions League: 2012

Kashiwa Reysol
 J.League Cup runner-up: 2020

South Korea U23
 Asian Games: 2014

South Korea
 AFC Asian Cup runner-up: 2015
 EAFF Championship: 2015, 2019

Individual
 K League 1 Best XI: 2013
 Korean FA Fans' Goalkeeper of the Year: 2016
 EAFF Championship Best Goalkeeper: 2019

Notes

References

External links

Profile at Vissel Kobe

1990 births
Living people
Association football goalkeepers
South Korean footballers
Ulsan Hyundai FC players
Vissel Kobe players
Kashiwa Reysol players
Al-Shabab FC (Riyadh) players
K League 1 players
J1 League players
Saudi Professional League players
2014 FIFA World Cup players
2015 AFC Asian Cup players
Footballers at the 2010 Asian Games
Footballers at the 2014 Asian Games
Asian Games medalists in football
Asian Games gold medalists for South Korea
Asian Games bronze medalists for South Korea
Sportspeople from Ulsan
Medalists at the 2010 Asian Games
Medalists at the 2014 Asian Games
2018 FIFA World Cup players
South Korea under-17 international footballers
South Korea under-20 international footballers
South Korea under-23 international footballers
South Korea international footballers
South Korean expatriate footballers
Expatriate footballers in Japan
South Korean expatriate sportspeople in Japan
Expatriate footballers in Saudi Arabia
South Korean expatriate sportspeople in Saudi Arabia
2019 AFC Asian Cup players
21st-century South Korean people
2022 FIFA World Cup players